Wellington (often known as the Wellington Lions) are a New Zealand professional rugby union team based in Wellington, New Zealand. The union was originally established in 1879, with the National Provincial Championship established in 1976. They now play in the reformed National Provincial Championship competition. They play their home games at Sky Stadium in Wellington. The team is affiliated with the Hurricanes Super Rugby franchise. Their home playing colours are black and gold.

Current squad

The Wellington Lions squad for the 2022 Bunnings NPC is:

Honours

Wellington have been overall Champions on 5 occasions. Their first title was in 1978 and their most recent title was in 2022. Their full list of honours include:

National Provincial Championship First Division
Winners: 1978, 1981, 1986, 2000

Mitre 10 Cup Championship Division
Winners: 2017

Bunnings NPC
Winners: 2022

Current Super Rugby players
Players named in the 2022 Wellington Lions squad, who also earned contracts or were named in a squad for any side participating in the 2022 Super Rugby Pacific season.

References

External links
Official site
Wellington Lions

National Provincial Championship
New Zealand rugby union teams
Sport in Wellington
Rugby union in the Wellington Region